Australian indie rock band Ball Park Music have released seven studio albums, two extended plays (EPs)  and twenty-one singles.

Studio albums

Extended plays

Singles

Music videos

References

Discographies of Australian artists
Alternative rock discographies
Rock music group discographies